Koby USA (Koby Language Center) is a private English language school located in downtown Novi, Michigan. Yoshihisa Kobayashi, founder and president of Koby International Academy, founded the school in 2006 in Ann Arbor, Michigan with the primary mission of teaching students with limited English proficiency the skills they need to succeed in academics, business, and life. The school was relocated in 2012 to its current location in Novi, Michigan.

Academic profile 
Koby USA offers various language programs including the Comprehensive English Program, Intensive English Program, Test Preparation Programs for TOEFL (TPPI), TOEIC (TPPII), and SAT (TPPIII), Academic English Program, Get Ready Program, Business English Program, English in Action, Personalized English Program, and Japanese Conversation Program. Various summer English programs are also offered in June, July, and August. Programs are generally four-week terms, except for some of the two-week-long summer programs.

Students include international students who are enrolled or entering grades K-12 in American schools, high school and post-graduate students who are preparing to take the TOEFL iBT (internet Based Test), and business professionals who need English skills for their profession and to prepare for the TOEIC test. The school also designs programs for businesses and individuals who have specific English needs and scheduling requirements.

The academic calendar runs month-to-month all year long. Students in the intensive English programs may spend up to eight months to go from Introductory to Advanced English proficiency. All programs run continuously, and students decide in how many terms they want to continue enrolling.

Campus and facilities 
The school sits above One World Market in Novi Michigan, a Japanese grocery store and sushi restaurant.

There are five classrooms and one administrative office. The school is again planning to relocate to another location in Novi on May 2, 2014.

External links 
Main Site

Companies based in Michigan
Schools in Michigan
Novi, Michigan